Shōnen Club (Shōnen Kurabu / 少年倶楽部, later 少年クラブ in 1946) was a monthly boys' magazine begun by Kodansha in November 1914. The magazine initially featured articles, poetry and serialized novels, but it began to focus more on creating manga content by the 1930s. The first manga, Norakuro, was published in the magazine in 1931. The magazine's success lead to the sister-publication of Shōjo Club in 1923, which offered similar content, but catered for girls.

Notable works

Novel serialization

Manga serialization

See also
List of manga magazines
Shōjo Club

References 

Defunct magazines published in Japan
Monthly manga magazines published in Japan
Semimonthly manga magazines published in Japan
Weekly manga magazines published in Japan
Shōnen manga magazines
Magazines established in 1914
1914 establishments in Japan
1962 disestablishments in Japan
Magazines disestablished in 1962
Kodansha magazines